"Sweet Talkin' Woman" is a 1978 single by Electric Light Orchestra (ELO) from the album Out of the Blue (1977). Its original title was "Dead End Street", but it was changed during recording. Some words that survived from that version can be heard in the opening of the third verse, "I've been livin' on a dead end street".

The track became the third top ten hit from the LP in the UK, peaking at number 6. As a novelty, initial copies of the 12-inch and 7-inch single formats were pressed in transparent purple vinyl. "Sweet Talkin’ Woman" is written in the key of C major.

The version released in the United States was 10 seconds shorter than its British counterpart due to a slightly faster mix. In the US, it reached number 17 on the Billboard Hot 100.

Critical reception
AllMusic's Donald A. Guarisco said "Sweet Talkin' Woman" was "their first real step into the disco sound [...] a string-laden pop tune whose dance-friendly edge helped it become a disco-era hit", attributing its disco sound to "Bev Bevan's steady drum work lays down a dance-friendly rhythm as pounding piano lines, delirous bursts of swirling strings, and endlessly overdubbed backing vocals mesh seamlessly to form an ornate but driving funhouse of pop hooks". Billboard described the song as a "catchy rocker characterized by semi-classical elements." Cash Box said that it has "syncopated harmonies and fullbodied instrumental accompaniments." Record World said that "rock and doo wop mix with ELO's strings and guitars in a busy but melodic way."  Ultimate Classic Rock critic Michael Gallucci rated it ELO's 6th best song, saying that it has a "one-of-a-kind chorus and that it is "one of ELO's greatest group performances."

Chart performance

Weekly charts

Year-end charts

Certifications

References

External links
Lyrics of this song
In-depth song analysis at the Jeff Lynne Song Database

1977 songs
1978 singles
Disco songs
Electric Light Orchestra songs
Jet Records singles
Song recordings produced by Jeff Lynne
Songs written by Jeff Lynne